Blat is a municipality in the Byblos District of  Keserwan-Jbeil Governorate, Lebanon. It is a suburb of Byblos and is 40 kilometers north of Beirut. Blat has an average elevation of 190 meters above sea level and a total land area of 683 hectares.   Its inhabitants are predominantly Maronite Catholics. As of 2008, there were three private schools in the village enrolling 2,560 students, in addition to a campus of the Lebanese American University. There were 28 companies with more than five employees operating in Blat.

References

Populated places in Byblos District
Maronite Christian communities in Lebanon